Theodor Becker (18 February 1880, Mannheim – 26 June 1952, Coppenbrügge) was a German stage and film actor. He was married to Maria Fein and was the father of Maria Becker. Becker acted mostly at the Niedersächsisches Staatstheater Hannover but also appeared on the Berlin stage as well as in a number of silent films.

Selected filmography
 The Wandering Light (1916)
 The Plague of Florence (1919)
 Das Fest der schwarzen Tulpe (1920)
 The Black Tulip Festival (1920)
 Susanne Stranzky (1921)
 Jeremias (1922)
 Fridericus Rex (1923)
 Felicitas Grolandin (1923)
 William Tell (1923)
 I.N.R.I. (1923)
 Wood Love (1925)
 Athletes (1925)
 Das deutsche Lied (1928)

External links

1880 births
1952 deaths
German male film actors
German male silent film actors
German male stage actors
Actors from Mannheim
20th-century German male actors